Cuba–Turkey relations are foreign relations between Cuba and Turkey. 

Diplomatic relations between Turkey and Cuba were established in 1952. Turkey opened its first Embassy in the Caribbean in Havana in 1979.

H.E. Recep Tayyip Erdoğan, President of the Republic of Turkey paid a visit to Cuba on 10-11 February 2015. This was the first presidential visit from Turkey to Cuba and was a milestone for the bilateral relations between the two countries. In November 2022, President Miguel Díaz-Canel Bermúdez of Cuba paid an official visit to Turkey.

Official Visits

Economic Relations

Trade volume between the two countries was 54.7 million USD in 2019 (Turkish exports/imports: 42.9/11.8 million USD).

Resident diplomatic missions
 Cuba has an embassy in Ankara.
 Turkey has an embassy in Havana.

See also 

 Foreign relations of Cuba
 Foreign relations of Turkey
 Cuban Missile Crisis

References 

 
Turkey
Bilateral relations of Turkey